Oje Ken Ollivierre (born 14 June 1981), popularly known as Protoje, is a contemporary reggae singer and songwriter from Jamaica. His mother is Jamaican singer Lorna Bennett, best known for her 1972 rendition of "Breakfast in Bed". His father is a former calypso singer Mike Ollivierre from the island nation of Saint Vincent and the Grenadines. He has one daughter with his wife Lindsay.

Music career
He was born in Saint Elizabeth, Jamaica. Protoje first gained notice for his 2005 mixtape Lyrical Overdose Volume 1, featuring mostly hip hop-influenced songs. With a guest appearance by Busy Signal, however, his future career was leveled as a reggae and dancehall artist. In 2010, Protoje began working with Don Corleon Records, run by his cousin and popular Jamaican producer Don Corleon. After releasing "Dread", "JA" and "Roll" in 2010, Protoje's debut album, entitled The Seven Year Itch, was released on 25 January 2011. The first single off the album, dubbed "Arguments" (2009), was responsible for his early popularity in Jamaica. In 2011, he released another single off the album entitled "Rasta Love" featuring Ky-Mani Marley.

His second album, The 8 Year Affair, was released 12 February 2013. "Who Dem a Program" was the first single released from the album in January 2012, with "This Is Not a Marijuana Song" following mid-year. "Kingston Be Wise" was heavily promoted via traditional and social media. On the day of its release, 5 November 2012, the music video became the most viewed YouTube link among internet users in Jamaica. The hashtag #KBW was used on Twitter. The song "Kingston Be Wise" (a remake of Ini Kamoze's song "England be nice") was featured in the video game Grand Theft Auto V on the in-game "Blue Ark" radio station, increasing its popularity further and making an international name for the reggae artist. Protoje cited reggae artist Ini Kamoze and group Black Uhuru as influences when recording the album.

In December 2014 Protoje was included on BBC Radio 1Xtra's 'Hot for 2015' list.

His third album Ancient Future was initially set for release in September 2014, but was put back until March 2015. Produced by Phillip "Winta" James, the album includes the song "Who Knows", a collaboration with Chronixx, which was released as a single. Two tracks from the album, "Answer to Your Name" and "Criminal" were released ahead of the album as exclusives on the England Be Wise mixtape for BBC 1xtra DJ Toddla T. Two weeks after its release it topped the Billboard Top Reggae Albums chart. "Who Knows" was certified Silver by BPI in 2022.

On 14 June 2016, Protoje released Side B of his fourth studio album, Royalty Free, as a free download to the public on his website.

His 2018 album, A Matter of Time, received a Grammy Award nomination in the Best Reggae Album category.

On 27 March 2020, Protoje joined Chronixx on a remix of Alicia Keys' song Underdog.

On 13 April 2020, Protoje announced a new label deal with RCA Records.  The deal allowed him "a certain level of creative control" and included artists Lila Iké and Sevana who he had been mentoring under his own In.Digg.Nation label.

On 28 August 2020, Protoje released his fifth studio album In Search Of Lost Time, which peaked at No. 6 on the Billboard Reggae Albums chart.

On 23 September 2022, Protoje released his sixth studio album Third Time's The Charm, which peaked at No. 8 on the Billboard Reggae Albums chart and has secured him a Grammy Nomination.

Discography

Mixtapes
2005: Lyrical Overdose Volume 1
2011: This Is Protoje
2013: Music from My Heart
2015: Kingston Be Wise (Toddla T Meets Protoje)

Albums
2011: Seven Year Itch
2013: The 8 Year Affair
2015: Ancient Future
2016: Royalty Free
2018: A Matter of Time
2020: In Search of Lost Time  (Deluxe version released in 2021)
2022: Third Time's the Charm

Singles
2009: "Arguments"
2010: "Dread"
2010: "JA"
2010: "Roll"
2011: "Rasta Love" (featuring "Ky-Mani Marley")
2012: "Who Dem a Program"
2012: "This Is Not a Marijuana Song"
2012: "Kingston Be Wise"
2013: "I&I"
2013: "Resist Not Evil (Militancy Riddim)" (Overstand Entertainment)
2014: "Who Knows" (featuring Chronixx)
2014: "Stylin'"
2015: "Answer to Your Name"
2015: "Bubblin'"
2015: "Sudden Flight" (featuring Jesse Royal and Sevana)
2017: "Blood Money"
2018: "Bout Noon"
2018: "Criminal"'
2020: "Switch It Up"
2021: "Still Blooming" (featuring Lila Iké and Izy Beats)
2022: "Hills"
2022: "Family" (featuring Jesse Royal)

References

External links
 
 Exclusive Video Interview with Protoje @ Reggae.Today – (2015 Reggae.Today)

1981 births
Living people
Jamaican male singers
Jamaican reggae singers
Jamaican singer-songwriters
People from Saint Elizabeth Parish
Jamaican Rastafarians
Performers of Rastafarian music
Jamaican people of Saint Vincent and the Grenadines descent
Easy Star Records artists